The Boulevard de la Madeleine is one of the four 'grands boulevards' of Paris, France, a chain of roads running east–west that includes the boulevard de la Madeleine, the boulevard des Capucines, the boulevard des Italiens and the boulevard Montmartre.

The boulevard is named after the nearby Église de la Madeleine.

Notable addresses 
n°5 : In the 1920s, la Galerie Adolphe LeGoup was located here.

n°11: Building where Alphonsine Plessis, better known as Marie Duplessis died in February 1847. Her life and death were depicted by Alexandre Dumas fils in the novel la Dame aux Camélias and by Giuseppe Verdi in the opera La Traviata.

Cultural references
In 1966, The Moody Blues recorded a single named after this boulevard.

References

Madeleine, boulevard de
Madeleine, boulevard de
Madeleine, boulevard de
Madeleine